"The Ensigns of Command" is the second episode of the third season of the syndicated American science fiction television series Star Trek: The Next Generation, the 50th episode overall, first broadcast on October 2, 1989.

Set in the 24th century, the series follows the adventures of the Starfleet crew of the Federation starship Enterprise-D.  In this episode, Lieutenant Commander Data (Brent Spiner) must convince a reluctant colony of more than 15,000 to prepare for immediate evacuation while Captain Picard (Patrick Stewart) attempts to negotiate a three-week reprieve from aliens intent on colonizing the planet themselves in four days and wiping out any humans found there.

Plot 

The Federation starship Enterprise, under the command of Captain Jean-Luc Picard (Patrick Stewart), receives an automated message from the Sheliak: Remove the humans on planet Tau Cygni V in four days. The Sheliak are a non-humanoid species with little regard for human life and would exterminate any humans found in their path. Their message is only due to their obligation under a treaty with the Federation to notify their intention to colonize before taking further action.

There is no record of a Federation colony ship being sent there as it contains levels of hyperonic radiation lethal to humans, which doesn't explain why the Sheliak indicate otherwise. The Enterprise arrives in the system to find what looks to be a small colony on the surface. The android Second Officer, Lt. Cmdr. Data (Brent Spiner), takes a shuttlecraft to the planet to coordinate the evacuation as he is the only crewmember unaffected by the radiation. Once he arrives, he finds that the sensor readings were incorrect. He is informed by local greeters Haritath (Mark L. Taylor) and Kentor (Richard Allen) that it is a colony of 15,253 people, the descendants of the wayward colony ship Artemis launched 92 years prior. The colonists' ancestors found a means to survive within the radiation but initially suffered heavy loss of life before an effective defense was found.

Although it would normally be a simple matter of beaming the colonists off the planet, hyperonic radiation renders the transporters useless. Because of this, a complete evacuation of the planet would take an estimated three weeks, and the Sheliak are not willing to give the Federation any extra time beyond the three days required by the treaty.

After explaining the situation and being rebuffed by the colony's leader, Gosheven (Grainger Hines), Data is befriended by a sympathetic colonist named Ard'rian (Eileen Seeley). She expresses interest in Data as an android and invites Data to her home, where they discuss ways to persuade the colonists to evacuate. To his puzzlement Ard'rian kisses Data. When Data explains to the colonists that they should evacuate their world before its imminent destruction and then pointing out  by reverse psychology that the only result of their heroic hopeless last stand will be their total annihilation, Gosheven, speaking for the colonists, refuses to leave, insisting they will protect themselves by fighting.

With time running out, Picard and the Enterprise crew begin poring through the 500,000-word treaty in the hopes of finding something they can use to their advantage.

At a meeting at  Ard'rian's home, Data talks to several of the colonists who are thinking of leaving the doomed colony; Gosheven comes in and "shocks" Data. Data recovers and
reasons that if persuasion cannot work, then intimidation through a show of force should be his next option. Modifying his phaser to work in the hyperonic atmosphere, he raids the colonists' aqueduct to prove they are helpless to defend their livelihood. When Data easily overpowers/stuns the colonists guarding the aqueduct, he points out that if they can't defend against a single person with a phaser, then they aren't capable of fighting the hundreds of Sheliak, who would likely destroy them via orbital bombardment. Data then sends a phaser charge up the aqueduct system to plug up the water that is vital to the colony's survival, convincing the colonists to evacuate the world. Gosheven reluctantly relents.

Back on the Enterprise, Picard exploits a loophole in the treaty. He invokes a section calling for third-party arbitration to resolve the dispute and names as arbitrators the Grizzelas, a species that is in its hibernation cycle for another six months. Picard offers the Sheliak a choice: wait six months for the Grizzelas to come out of hibernation, or give the Federation three weeks to evacuate the colony. Outmaneuvered, the Sheliak agree to the three weeks.

Just as Data is about to leave the colony in his shuttle, Ard'rian comes to say goodbye. She asks Data if he has any feeling over what has just happened, and Data explains that he cannot experience feelings. To her surprise, he then kisses Ard'rian. She remarks that he "realized" she needed a kiss; Data leaves Ard'rian and returns to the Enterprise.

Aboard the Enterprise, Picard comments on Data's performance at a classical concert before his mission with the human colonists. Picard tells Data he performed with feeling, and Data reminds Picard that he has no feeling. Picard says that this is hard to believe, noting his fusion of two very different music styles in his performance suggests real creativity. At that, and in obvious reflection of his recent solution of the colony problem, Data concedes that he has become more creative when necessary.

Reception 
The A.V. Club gave it B+.
Tor.com gave it 7 out of 10.

Releases 
The episode was released with Star Trek: The Next Generation season three DVD box set, released in the United States on July 2, 2002. This had 26 episodes of Season 3 on seven discs, with a Dolby Digital 5.1 audio track. It was released in high-definition Blu-ray in the United States on April 30, 2013.

This was released in Japan on LaserDisc on July 5, 1996, in the half season set Log. 5: Third Season Part.1 by CIC Video. This included episodes from "Ensign of Command" (also "Evolution") to "A Matter of Perspective" on 12-inch double sided optical discs. The video was in NTSC format with both English and Japanese audio tracks.

References

 Star Trek The Next Generation DVD set, volume 3, disc 1, selection 2

External links

 

Fiction set around Beta Lyrae
Star Trek: The Next Generation (season 3) episodes
1989 American television episodes
Television episodes directed by Cliff Bole